Martin Medlar (4 December 1899 – 4 June 1965) was an Irish Fianna Fáil politician who served as a Teachta Dála (TD) for the Carlow–Kilkenny constituency from 1956 to 1965.

A farmer by profession, he was elected to Dáil Éireann as a Fianna Fáil TD for the Carlow–Kilkenny constituency at the 1956 by-election caused by the death of Thomas Walsh of Fianna Fáil. He was re-elected at the 1957 and 1961 general elections. He lost his seat at the 1965 general election.

References

1899 births
1965 deaths
Fianna Fáil TDs
Members of the 15th Dáil
Members of the 16th Dáil
Members of the 17th Dáil
Irish farmers